Canarreos Archipelago is an archipelago of Cuba.

It is bordered to the east by the Gulf of Cazones, to the north by the Gulf of Batabano and to the west by the Los Indios Channel.

It comprises roughly 350 islets, and is almost as long as the Florida Keys.
By far the largest island of the archipelago is Isla de la Juventud, while the second largest is Cayo Largo del Sur.

List of Islands

1) The Islands area and population data retrieved from the 2012 census.

See also
Geography of Cuba
List of Caribbean islands

References

Islands of Cuba